Hydrazine oxidoreductase (HAO (ambiguous)) is an enzyme with systematic name hydrazine:acceptor oxidoreductase. This enzyme catalyses the following chemical reaction

 hydrazine + acceptor  N2 + reduced acceptor

Hydrazine oxidoreductase is involved in the pathway of anaerobic ammonium oxidation in anammox bacteria.

References

External links 
 

EC 1.7.99